Crash Diagnostic is the third and final album by punk band Discount. It was released in 2000 on New American Dream.

It has a much heavier edge than Discount's previous two albums. The band split up later that year.

Critical reception
AllMusic called the album "an amazing swan song," writing that "jagged guitars and bizarre timing make the record distinctive, and the sturdy punk backbone remains intact enough to give the energetic tracks a pummeling core." Spin wrote that "Discount bust out ... with punky power-pop songs and untempered female angst." CMJ New Music Report wrote that "with head-boppin' melodies, Discount puts the punk back into the spunky girl rock genre." Billboard wrote: "More female-friendly power pop than hardcore, [Crash Diagnostic] effectively uses the formula of raw, urgent vocals supplied by firecracker Mosshart and speeding garage hooks from her backing boy bandmates."

Track listing

Personnel

Alison Mosshart – vocals
Ryan Seagrist – guitar
Todd Rockhill – bass
Bill Nesper – drums
J. Robbins – recording

References

External links
Discount (2) - Crash Diagnostic

2000 albums
Discount (band) albums